Gary Northfield is a British cartoonist, most famous for his Derek the Sheep comic strip published in DC Thomson's The Beano and BeanoMAX.

Northfield graduated from Harrow College University of Westminster with a degree in Illustration in 1992.  He joined the British small press comics community in 1999, creating various titles such as Great!, Little Box of Comics and Stupidmonsters. In 2002, he acquired the position of in-house illustrator at Eaglemoss Publications, where he worked for five years on projects such as Horrible Histories Magazine, Horrible Science Magazine and The Magical World of Roald Dahl.

Derek the Sheep began appearing in The Beano from February 2004, and is unique in that it is The Beanos first and only creator-owned character. A collection of early Derek the Sheep stories was published by Bloomsbury Publishing in September 2008 and in France by Actes Sud/Editions De L'an2, reprinting the first thirteen strips in The Beano.

In 2008, Northfield illustrated the comic strip Pinky's Crackpot Circus for The Dandy, and wrote and drew World's Greatest Heroes for National Geographic Kids. In 2009, he created Little Cutie for The DFC. In 2012 his strip Gary's Garden began appearing regularly in the weekly comic, The Phoenix, with the first year's worth of strips collected in the book The Phoenix Presents - Gary's Garden: Book 1. In 2016, he returned to The Beano with the strip Zooella.

He also illustrated the children's books Henry VIII Has To Choose and Sleeping Beauty: 100 Years Later, for Franklin Watts.

In 2013, Walker Books published The Terrible Tales Of The Teenytinysaurs, a collection of never-before published strips.

Northfield's first children's novel and international best seller Julius Zebra: Rumble with the Romans!, was published by Walker books in March 2015. His subsequent books in the series are: Julius Zebra: Battle with the Britons!, Julius Zebra: Entangled with the Egyptians!, with the next installment Julius Zebra: Grapple with the Greeks! published in October 2018. His first joke book, Julius Zebra Joke Book Jamboree! was published in June 2019.

In 2017, Northfield alongside his partner, established a new children’s comic book publisher, Bog Eyed Books.

Books
Derek the Sheep (2008) — Bloomsbury Publishing
Henry VIII Has To Choose with Julia Jarman (2009) — Franklin Watts
Sleeping Beauty: 100 Years Later with Laura North (2010) — Franklin Watts
The Terrible Tales of the Teenytinysaurs (2013)  — Walker Books
The Phoenix Presents - Gary's Garden: Book 1 (2014)  — David Fickling Books
Julius Zebra - Rumble With The Romans! (2015)  — Walker Books 
Julius Zebra - Battle With The Britons! (2016)   — Walker Books
Julius Zebra - Entangled with the Egyptians (2017)  - Walker Books
Julius Zebra - Grapple with the Greeks! (2018)  — Walker Books
Julius Zebra - Joke Book Jamboree! (2019)  - Walker Books

List of published comics
Derek the Sheep (2004-2011) — The Beano and BeanoMAX
Life of Roald Dahl with Glenn Dakin (2006-2008) — The Magical World of Roald Dahl
Pinky's Crackpot Circus (2008) — The Dandy
Little Cutie (2008-2009) — The DFC
World's Greatest Heroes (2008-2010) and Max the Mouse (2010–present) — National Geographic Kids
Gary's Garden (2012–present) — The Phoenix
Zoo-Ella  (2016) — The Beano

References

External links
Northfield's website
United Agent's profile

British comics writers
British comics artists
Living people
The Dandy people
The Beano people
Year of birth missing (living people)